During the 1996–97 season Milan Associazione Calcio competed in Serie A, Coppa Italia, UEFA Champions League and Supercoppa.

Summary
Milan Associazione Calcio fell into pieces once Fabio Capello left his job to join Real Madrid. The new organisation with Óscar Tabárez as technical director completely miscued its signings, with neither Jesper Blomqvist, Edgar Davids, Christophe Dugarry or Michael Reiziger being successful. After a Supercoppa Italiana defeat against Fiorentina at home at the San Siro, a 2–3 loss at Piacenza for the league cost the Uruguayan his position. Tabarez was replaced by former championship winning coach Arrigo Sacchi, the change did not happen and days later due to a 2–1 defeat to Rosenborg at home in the Champions League the team was not qualified to Quarterfinals. The Rossoneri eventually finished 11th managed to save the reigning champions' contract in Serie A by just six points.

The miserable season also prompted captain Franco Baresi to end his active career, with Milan retiring the #6 shirt in his honour.

Squad

Transfers

In

Transfers out

Loans ended

Loans out

Special kit
For several matches the team wore a special kit.
{| width=92% |
|-
|

Results

Pre-season and friendlies

Friendlies

Costantino Rozzi Memorial

Trofeo de Navarra

Opel Masters Cup

Amsterdam Arena Cup

Luigi Berlusconi Trophy

Competitions

Serie A

League table

Results summary

Results by round

Matches

Coppa Italia

Second Round

Eightfinals

Quarterfinals

Supercoppa Italiana

UEFA Champions League

Group stage

Statistics

Appearances and goals

|-
! colspan=14 style=background:#dcdcdc; text-align:center| Players transferred out during the season

Goalscorers

Players in italics left the team during the season.

Clean sheets

Disciplinary record

Players in italics left the team during the season.

References

External links
RSSSF – Italy 1996/97

A.C. Milan seasons
Milan